Roy Evatt Dexter (born 13 April 1955 in Nottingham) is an English former first-class cricketer active 1975–81 who played for Nottinghamshire.

See also
Cricket in England
Cricket in Ireland
Cricket in Scotland
Cricket in Wales
England cricket team
England women's cricket team
List of Nottinghamshire County Cricket Club players

References

1955 births
English cricketers
Nottinghamshire cricketers
Living people